is a passenger railway station located in the city of Himeji, Hyōgo Prefecture, Japan, operated by the private Sanyo Electric Railway.

Lines

Station layout
The station consists of two unnumbered ground-level side platforms connected by a level crossing. The station building and sole entrance is located west of the Sanyo-Aboshi bound platform.  The station is unattended.

Platforms

Adjacent stations

|-
!colspan=5|Sanyo Electric Railway

History
Hiramatsu Station opened on March 10, 1942. The naming rights of the station were acquired by Yamato Kogyo Group on 1 December 2018, and the station is now subtitled .

Passenger statistics
In fiscal 2018, the station was used by an average of 714 passengers daily (boarding passengers only).

Surrounding area
Kibi Post Office
 Otsumo River

See also
List of railway stations in Japan

References

External links

 Official website (Sanyo Electric Railway) 

Railway stations in Japan opened in 1942
Railway stations in Himeji